Free Academy may refer to:

 Bellows Free Academy, Fairfax, public K-12 school in Fairfax, Vermont
 Bellows Free Academy, St. Albans, secondary school (grades 9-12) in St. Albans, Vermont
 Elmira Free Academy, high school located in the city of Elmira, New York
 Newburgh Free Academy, public high school in Newburgh, New York
 Norwich Free Academy, high school located in the city of Norwich, Connecticut
 Rome Free Academy, secondary school located in Rome, New York
 Vrije Academie voor Beeldende Kunsten (Free Academy of Visual Art), The Hague, The Netherlands
 The New York Free Academy, established in 1847, the original name of the City College of New York